A number of organizations use the title Association for the Advancement of Science or a variation of.

Organizations 

American Association for the Advancement of Science
Australian and New Zealand Association for the Advancement of Science originally the Australasian Association for the Advancement of Science
Brazilian Association for the Advancement of Science, Sociedade Brasileira para o Progresso da Ciência (Portuguese), also translated Brazilian Association for the Progress of Science.
British Association for the Advancement of Science, now the British Science Association
Muslim Association for the Advancement of Science, in India
Pakistan Association for the Advancement of Science
Southern Africa Association for the Advancement of Science, originally the South African Association for the Advancement of Science